Isabella May (née Malcolm, 22 June 1850 – 1 May 1926) was a New Zealand temperance worker, suffragist and dress reformer.

May was born in Hoxton, London, England, on 22 June 1850, and was the younger sister of suffragist Kate Sheppard. She arrived in New Zealand in 1869 with her mother, Kate, and their two brothers. In 1879, ten years after landing in Christchurch, she married Henry Ernest May.

May would work alongside other feminists and social activists to enact changes in New Zealand. Her efforts would be recognised abroad for her role in the Woman's Christian Temperance Union.

In 1897 May became president of the Canterbury Women's Institute.

References

1850 births
1926 deaths
New Zealand temperance activists
New Zealand suffragists
People from Hoxton
English emigrants to New Zealand
19th-century New Zealand people